Václav Chaloupecký (12 May 1882 Dětenice, Austria-Hungary – 22 November 1951 Dětenice, Czechoslovakia) was a Czech historian, a student of prominent Czech historian Josef Pekař and the main representative of historians in mid-war Slovakia.

Life 
He had studied at the Faculty of Arts, Charles University in Prague (1903–1907). Then he had worked as an archivist and librarian in Roudnice nad Labem (1907–1919). In 1919, he became a state inspector of Slovak archives and libraries (1919–1938). In the same time, he was also a docent (1922) and professor (1922–1938) of the Czechoslovak history at Comenius University. He held several academic positions e.g. dean (1929–1930) and vice-dean (1930–1931) of the Faculty of Arts, rector (1937–1938) and vice-rector (1938–1939) of the university. In 1939 he became an extraordinary professor at the Faculty of Arts in Prague where he had lectured until 1951 (except WWII). A member of the Scholastic Society of Šafárik.

Work 
 Jan IV. z Dražic, poslední biskup pražský (1908)
 František Palacký (1912)
 Dvě úvahy o národním probuzení na Slovensku (1920)
 K nejstarším dějinám Bratislavy (1922)
 Československé dějiny (1922)
 Staré Slovensko (Sp. fil. fak. Brat. 1923)
 Unsere Grenze gegen Ugarn (1923)
 Das historische recht der magyarischen Nation auf die territoriale Integrität (1923)
 Na úsvitě křesťanství (1924)
 Dvě studie k dějinám Podkarpatska (1925)
 Padělky staroslovenských zpěvů historických (1925)
 K dějinám valdenských v Čechách před hnutím husitským (1925)
 Česká hranice východní koncem XI. století (1926)
 Slovenské diaecese a tak řečená apoštolská práva uherská (1928)
 Martinská deklarace a její politické osudy (1928)
 O znaku Slovenska (1929)
 Nitra a počátky křesťanství na Slovensku (1930)
 Zápas o Slovensko – 1918 (1930)
 Der modus vivendi und die Slowakei (1931)
 Kniha Žilinská (1934)
 Svatý Vojtěch a slovanská liturgie (1934)
 Universita Petra Pázmánya a Slovensko (1935)
 Středověké listy ze Slovenska. Sbierka listov a listín písaných jazykom národným z rokov 1462-1490 (1937)
 Počátky státu českého a polského (1937)
 Svatováclavský sborník (1939)
 Arnošt z Pardubic: první arcibiskup pražský (1346-1364) (1941)
 Na úsvitě křesťanství (1942)
 Odkaz minulosti české (1946)
 Valaši na Slovensku (1947)
 Karlova universita v Praze 1348 až 1409 (1948)
 Středověké legendy pyearopské : jejich historický rozbor a texty (1953)

References

Citations

Bibliography 
 Biografický slovník archivářů českých zemí / Jaroslava Hoffmanová, Jana Pražáková. Praha : Libri, 2000. 830 s. . S. 257.

External links 
 Václav Chaloupecký na stránkách Univerzity Komenského v Bratislavě
 Václav Chaloupecký v Akademickém bulletinu AV ČR
 Václav Chaloupecký v České bibliografické databázi

20th-century Czech historians
Academic staff of Charles University
1882 births
1951 deaths
Historians from the Austro-Hungarian Empire